Sar Band (also Romanized as Sarband; also known as Sar Band-e Maskūn) is a village in Maskun Rural District, Jebalbarez District, Jiroft County, Kerman Province, Iran. At the 2006 census, its population was 142, in 32 families.

References 

Populated places in Jiroft County